The following is a list of squads for each nation competing at UEFA Euro 2008 in Austria and Switzerland. The tournament started on 7 June and the final took place in Vienna on 29 June 2008.

Each national team had to submit a squad of 23 players, three of whom had to be goalkeepers, by 28 May 2008. If a player was injured severely enough to prevent his participation in the tournament before his team's first match, he could be replaced by another player.

All caps, goals, ages, and clubs of players are correct as of 7 June 2008, the first day of the tournament.

Group A

Czech Republic
Manager: Karel Brückner

Portugal
Manager:  Luiz Felipe Scolari

Quim injured a wrist on 6 June and was replaced by Nuno.

Switzerland
Manager: Köbi Kuhn

Turkey
Manager: Fatih Terim

Group B

Austria
Manager: Josef Hickersberger

Croatia
Manager: Slaven Bilić

Germany
Manager: Joachim Löw

Poland
Manager:  Leo Beenhakker

Jakub Błaszczykowski injured a hamstring on 5 June and was replaced by Łukasz Piszczek. Tomasz Kuszczak injured his back on 6 June and was replaced by Wojciech Kowalewski.

Group C

France
Manager: Raymond Domenech

Italy
Manager: Roberto Donadoni

Fabio Cannavaro was ruled out of the Italian squad on 2 June after he was injured in training; he was replaced by Alessandro Gamberini.

Netherlands
Manager: Marco van Basten

Ryan Babel was ruled out of the Dutch squad on 31 May after he was injured in training; he was replaced by Khalid Boulahrouz.

Romania
Manager: Victor Piţurcă

Group D

Greece
Manager:  Otto Rehhagel

Russia
Manager:  Guus Hiddink

Pavel Pogrebnyak failed to recover from injury and was replaced by on 7 June.

Spain
Manager: Luis Aragonés

Sweden
Manager: Lars Lagerbäck

Player representation
by club

By club nationality

Nations in italics were not represented by their national teams in the finals

by representatives of domestic league

Notes

References

External links
Euro 2008 official site

2008
Squads